Stocking Creek is a stream in Wadena County, in the U.S. state of Minnesota.

Stocking Creek was named for the fact it heads at Stocking Lake.

See also
List of rivers of Minnesota

References

Rivers of Wadena County, Minnesota
Rivers of Minnesota